Michael Huey (born September 21, 1964) is an American contemporary artist based in Vienna, Austria. He often employs found photography and archival resources to create new photographic images, objects, installations, and videos. His work has been shown in Vienna, Berlin, Rome, London, Lisbon, Sofia,  Cleveland, and New York City, and written about in Art in America, Artforum, The Wall Street Journal, and The New Yorker.

Background
Huey was born in Traverse City, Michigan. He graduated from Amherst College in 1987 with a degree in German Studies. He has lived in Vienna since 1989, and received a master's degree in art history at the University of Vienna in 1999. He is married to Viennese art historian Christian Witt-Dörring.

Alongside his work as an artist, Huey has also published extensively, first as a staff member of The Christian Science Monitor, and more recently as a memoirist writing about his family's roots in Chicago and Leelanau County, Michigan. He is a regular contributor to the London-based magazine The World of Interiors and has written about art and design for exhibition catalogues, newspapers, and magazines in both Europe and the United States.

Work
Huey's artistic practice has been linked by critics to his interest in family history, archives, and inventories. The arts magazine EIKON has written that Huey's works "are like news that reaches us from the past and are kept as poetry in time." According to Artforum magazine, "Huey's process defamiliarizes...objects to the extent that they become alien, worthy of scrutiny." 

The concepts of loss and legacy tie his works together over a wide range of media. One of his techniques involves re-photographing and/or re-using existing photographs and papers. He also incorporates found objects into his exhibitions. Recent shows have involved installations of large-scale wall paintings or wallpapers Huey has designed.

Images from Huey's "China Cupboard" series have been likened by The New Yorker to the work of early photography pioneer William Henry Fox Talbot.

Individual works by Huey have been shown at the Kunsthalle Wien, the Sigmund Freud Museum in Vienna, the Museum der Moderne Salzburg, the Mead Art Museum in Amherst, Massachusetts, and the Cleveland Museum of Art. In 2014 he joined the Secession, the Viennese artists’ association founded in 1897 by Gustav Klimt, Koloman Moser, Josef Hoffmann, and Joseph Maria Olbrich, among others.

References

External links

Facebook page

American contemporary artists
Amherst College alumni
People from Traverse City, Michigan
1964 births
Living people
Artists from Michigan